Madhabpur is a village, in Egra II CD block in Egra subdivision of Purba Medinipur district in the state of West Bengal, India.

Geography

Location

CD block HQ
The headquarters of Egra II CD block are located at Madhabpur.

Urbanisation
96.96% of the population of Egra subdivision live in the rural areas. Only 3.04% of the population live in the urban areas, and that is the lowest proportion of urban population amongst the four subdivisions in Purba Medinipur district.

Note: The map alongside presents some of the notable locations in the subdivision. All places marked in the map are linked in the larger full screen map.

Demographics
As per 2011 Census of India Madhabpur had a total population of 669 of which 333 (50%) were males and 336 (50%) were females. Population below 6 years was 63. The total number of literates in Madhabpur was 568 (93.73% of the population over 6 years).

Transport
A short stretch of a local road links Madhabpur to State Highway 5.

References

Villages in Purba Medinipur district